Prema Pasam is a 1956 Indian Tamil-language film, produced by V. L. Narasu and directed by Vedantam Raghavayya. It is a remake of the Hindi film Kismet (1943). The film stars Gemini Ganesan and Savitri, with music composed by S. Rajeswara Rao. It was simultaneously shot in Telugu as Bhale Ramudu (1956).

Plot 
Zamindar Narayana Pillai (Jandhyala Gaurinatha Sastry) has two daughters Prema & Tara and both learn dance since childhood. Especially Prema is fascinated to it for which Narayana Pillai constructs a theatre and affiliates dance teachers from all over the country. Nagabhushnam (V. K. Ramasamy) is the manager of Narayana Pillai who has two sons Ramakrishnan & Radhakrishnan. Once Ramu throws Prema from the staircase when she becomes a handicap. Knowing it, enraged Narayana Pillai guns on Ramu and he falls into the river. Right now, Narayana Pillai conceals himself, ahead, entrusting his property to Nagabhushnam. Exploiting the situation, Nagabhushnam grabs the authority leaving Prema & Tara as orphans. Years roll by, Prema (Savitri), by hard work studies and also takes care of Tara. Ramu (Gemini ganesh) returns as a huge burglar by the name Krishna. At present, he recognises everyone but hides his identity, acquainted with Prema and their relationship turns into love. Thereafter, Krishna steals a necklace from Nagabhusham and presents it to Prema but unfortunately, she was caught when Krishna affirms himself as a thief. At that moment, Prema loathes him and charges to discard from her life. Meanwhile, Radhakrishnan & Tara fall for each other, being cognizant to it, Nagabhushanam warns Prema and apart Gopal. By the time, Krishna releases rescue Tara from the suicide and assures to perform her marriage with Gopal. Parallelly, Krishna determines to relieve Prema from her disability, so, he picks up the help of his friend Rathnam and to raise the fund he again makes a robbery at Nagabhusham's house. At that point in time, Nagabhusham senses him as split-up son Ramu and gives a police complaint. Until, Prema becomes normal and repents, learning regarding Krishna's daring act. On the other side, Krishna plans to couple up Radhakrishnan & Tara when to seize him Police organises dance program of Prema which she too agrees, on a condition that Nagabhuashanam should quit the case on Krishna. Here wanderer Narayana Pillai also arrives to program and Krishna in disguise. After viewing it, Krishna leaps, successfully accomplishes the marriage of Radhakrishnan & Tara and surrenders himself. Just before, everyone lands at the venue when Krishna is recognised as Ramu by the tattoo on his arm. At last, Nagabhuashanam pleads pardon from Narayana Pillai and pays back his property which he delegates to Ramu. Finally, the movie ends on a happy note with the marriage of Ramu & Prema.

Cast 
Gemini Ganesan as Ramakrishnan/Krishna
Savitri as Prema
K. Sarangapani as Rathnam
V. K. Ramasamy as Nagabooshanam
K. Balaji as Radhakrishnan
T. P. Muthulakshmi as Thangam
Girija as Tara
M. G. Chakrapani as Inspector
Jandhyala Gaurinatha Sastry as Zamindar Narayana Pillai
Banerjee
E. V. Saroja as dancer in the song "Enga Ooru Singappooru"
K. Varalakshmi as Parvathi
 Sairam as Manager

Soundtrack 
Music composed by S. Rajeswara Rao. Lyrics were written by Thanjai N. Ramaiah Dass.

References

External links 
 

1950s Tamil-language films
Films directed by Vedantam Raghavayya
Films scored by S. Rajeswara Rao
Tamil remakes of Hindi films